Renta congelada is a Mexican sitcom that premiered on Las Estrellas on August 31, 2017. Created and produced by Pedro Ortiz de Pinedo for Televisa. It stars Rodrigo Murray, Juan Diego Covarrubias, Regina Blandón, and Patricia Manterola. The series revolves around the life of two couples totally opposed to each other, who by chance are forced to live under the same roof. The series has been renewed for a fifth season.

Plot

Season 1 
The series begins when newly married vegan hipsters, Ana (Regina Blandón) and Fernando (Juan Diego Covarrubias), rent a house at a low price. However, they are surprised to discover a couple in their forties, Delia (Patricia Manterola) and Federico (Rodrigo Murray), already living in the house, and who claim to have signed the same lease for five years. Both couples are right, because the elderly owner, who suffers from Alzheimer's, signed both contracts just before dying, so legally both couples have the same rights. This mistake happened because of the similarity in Federico and Fernando's names. Each couple hope that the other will  tire of the arrangement and leave, but since no one will go, they are forced to live together for five years. What occurs between both couples is a stark struggle, with constant conflicts fostered by their diametrically opposed lifestyles.

Season 2 
Delia and Federico, and Ana and Fernando must put aside their fight to get the others out of the house and work together to raise 500 thousand pesos in less than three months to pay a debt that the former owner inherited, and to be able to free the mortgage to keep the house.

Season 3
After Fernando is tricked by Federico and his best friend Luis Alberto to go look for Ana who seems to be lost, new comers rent the house. This is because Luis Alberto tricked Fernando into singing papers to leave him in charge of his finances. Luis Alberto rents the house to a couple for a 1 year lease. Sam, a woman with extreme needs of cleanliness and hygiene, and Nico, an extreme cheapskate who will do anything to save a buck. Luis Alberto allies himself with Nico and Sam to kick Federico and Delia out.

Cast

Main 
 Rodrigo Murray as Federico
 Juan Diego Covarrubias as Fernando
 Regina Blandón as Ana (seasons 1–2; guest season 4)
 Patricia Manterola as Delia
 José Eduardo Derbez as Nico Ramos (seasons 3–4)
 Adriana Montes de Oca as Samantha (seasons 3–4)
 Faisy as Luis Alberto (season 5; recurring seasons 1–4)

Recurring 
 Harold Azuara as Milton
 Héctor Sandarti as Carlos

Production 
The series is created by Pedro Ortiz de Pinedo and produced by Televisa. Filming of the series began on June 12, 2017. A total of 13 episodes were confirmed for the first season. Production of the second season began on July 9, 2018. Production of the third season began on March 5, 2020, however filming was suspended at the end of the same month due to the COVID-19 pandemic in Mexico. Filming resumed on June 8, 2020 and concluded in late July 2020. Filming of the fifth season began on February 8, 2023.

Episodes

Series overview

Season 1 (2017)

Season 2 (2019)

Season 3 (2020)

Season 4 (2022)

Awards and nominations

Notes

References

External links 
 

Las Estrellas original programming
Mexican television sitcoms
2017 Mexican television series debuts
Television series by Televisa
Spanish-language television shows